WWSX-LP (99.1 FM, "Radio Rehoboth") is a radio station licensed to serve the community of Rehoboth Beach, Delaware. The station is owned by East Sussex Public Broadcasting Company, Inc. It airs an adult album alternative format.

The station was assigned the WWSX-LP call letters by the Federal Communications Commission on October 23, 2014.

References

External links
 Official Website
 

WSX-LP
Radio stations established in 2017
2017 establishments in Delaware
Adult album alternative radio stations in the United States
Sussex County, Delaware
WSX-LP